Queer of color critique is an intersectional framework, grounded in Black feminism, that challenges the single-issue approach to queer theory by analyzing how power dynamics associated race, class, gender expression, sexuality, ability, culture and nationality influence the lived experiences of individuals and groups that hold one or more of these identities. Incorporating the scholarship and writings of Audre Lorde, Gloria Anzaldúa, Kimberlé Crenshaw, Barbara Smith, Cathy Cohen, Brittney Cooper and Charlene A. Carruthers, the queer of color critique asks: what is queer about queer theory if we are analyzing sexuality as if it is removed from other identities? The queer of color critique expands queer politics and challenges queer activists to move out of a "single oppression framework" and incorporate the work and perspectives of differently marginalized identities into their politics, practices and organizations. The Combahee River Collective Statement clearly articulates the intersecting forces of power: "The most general statement of our politics at the present time would be that we are actively committed to struggling against racial, sexual, heterosexual, and class oppression, and see as our particular task the development of integrated analysis and practice based upon the fact that major systems of oppression are interlocking. The synthesis of these oppressions creates the conditions of our lives." Queer of color critique demands that an intersectional lens be applied queer politics and illustrates the limitations and contradictions of queer theory without it. Exercised by activists, organizers, intellectuals, care workers and community members alike, the queer of color critique imagines and builds a world in which all people can thrive as their most authentic selves- without sacrificing any part of their identity.

Historical context 
Queer of color critique was a concept long before it was an established framework coined by Roderick Ferguson in The Aberrations in Black: Toward a Queer of Color Critique in 2004, and by Jose Esteban Muñoz in Disidentification: Queers of color and performance politics. Ferguson argues that the queer of color critique “interrogates social formation as the intersections of race, gender, sexuality and class, with particular interest in how those formations correspond with and diverge from nationalist ideals and practices.” Ferguson draws a connection between the capitalist nation-building and the state's regulation of gender and sexual eccentricities of non-white populations. Muñoz offers disidentification as a strategy of resistance that defies assimilation and challenges dominant ideology that associates queerness with whiteness, a concept that Ferguson then builds on further by challenging the universality of sexual heterogeneity. Without universality, it is possible to see differences as a source of strength and create new categories that are not fixed, but are experiencing constant change and reformation. Furthermore, without a "normal" or "natural" state of being, Ferguson states "queer of color analysis can be another step in the move beyond identity politics and toward what Angela Davis calls "unlikely and unprecedented coalitions."" The queer of color critique illuminates the ways that queer theory has been historically influenced by dominant ideology by treating the queer white experience as universal and failing to center the voices, needs, and bodies of those who exist at the margins of margins. Both Muñoz and Ferguson build on the scholarship of activists and intellectuals, whose ideas and contributions are explained below.

Audre Lorde 
In her speech The Master’s Tools Will Never Dismantle the Master’s House, Audre Lorde, a Black Feminist lesbian intellectual and activist, calls attention to the racism entrenched in the mainstream white feminist movement. Speaking at the New York University Institute for the Humanities conference, Lorde expresses disappointment at the absence of writings and voices of women of color and the paradoxical reliance on the few Black women, who were in fact invited to the conference, to explain how patriarchy is being reproduced within the feminist movement and how white women's experience is not universal and should not be valued as most important. In response, white women justified silencing marginalized narratives by advocating the importance of a unified message of women’s empowerment that could be all-encompassing. Lorde contends that within this color blind and assimilationist approach, transformative change is not possible. Lorde challenges all feminists to defy patriarchy by leaning into the idea that differences are sources of strength and power. Lorde imagines alternatives to change-making within the feminist movement: “In our world divide and conquer must become define and empower” because “refusing to recognize differences makes it impossible to see the different problems and pitfalls facing us as women.” The concept of defining difference to empower extends to queer theory and rejects lesbian separatism. If queerness is only associated with whiteness, it is impossible to clearly identify the different problems affecting the queer community as a whole.

In The Uses of the Erotic, a separate essay in Sister Outsider, Lorde provides a strategy for sustainable long term liberation work that has contributed to the queer of color critique by encouraging theorists and activists to seek joy, connection and pleasure from the work of change-making. Lorde writes "For the erotic is not a question only of what we do; it is a question of how acutely and fully we can feel in the doing [...] how often do we truly love our work even at its most difficult?" Lorde highlights the importance of loving the experience of doing the work- and not solely valuing the work itself- as an act of resistance to capitalism and a way of creating genuine change. "Recognizing the power of the erotic within our lives can give us the energy to pursue genuine change within our world, rather than merely settling for a shift of characters in the same weary drama. For not only do we touch our most profoundly creative source, but we do that which is female and self-affirming in the face of a racist, patriarchal, and anti-erotic society." This approach allows individuals to bring their whole creative selves to their activism and seek joy in the process of doing, thereby expanding, sustaining and queering the movement for change by distancing it from the capitalist notion that gives value only to the finished product. Queer theory is not just about dismantling heteronormativity, it is also about dismantling white supremacy and seeing how these different forms of oppression overlap.

Combahee River Collective 
The queer of color critique was also influenced by the Combahee River Collective Statement, written by a group of Black feminist lesbians in 1977 in Boston Massachusetts. The statement aimed to advance liberation for all people by identifying the interlocking nature of oppressive systems and laying out a blueprint for Black feminist organizing. The collective was also committed to long term struggle and built community a space that nurtured creativity, culture and care. Barbara Smith, Demita Fraizer and Beverly Smith were among the contributors to the statement, in which they recognize the activists that came before them- including but not limited to Angela Davis, Harriet Tubman, Sojourner Truth, Ida B. Wells, Mary Church Terrell- and articulate their political beliefs and approach to change-making. The Combahee River Collective statement calls for “the destruction of the political-economic systems of capitalism and imperialism as well as patriarchy.” Although the contributors identified as feminists and lesbians, they rejected lesbian separatism: "we feel solidarity with progressive Black men and do not advocate the fractionalization that white women who are separatists demand. Our situation as Black people necessitates that we have solidarity around the fact of race [...] we struggle together with Black men against racism, while we also struggle with Black men about sexism." This framework of holding both interlocking identities, and advocating for the destruction of both oppressive systems of racism and patriarchy, extends to the fight against heteronormativity. While the term queer of color critique had not yet been articulated, the Combahee River Collective alludes to the idea that sexuality exists in the bodies and lived experiences of people that hold other marginal identities. Queerness cannot be extracted as its own experience separate from race and class, thus queer theory must acknowledge how race and class oppression affect queer people of color.

Gloria Anzaldua 
Gloria Anzaldua, a Chicana lesbian author and activist, contributed to the queer of color critique by documenting and theorizing how queerness and sexuality interact with culture and language. In her book Borderlands/La Frontera: The New Mestiza, Anzaldua challenges readers to understand "borders," not merely as physical barriers that divide nation-states, but as an articulation of identity- invisible boundaries that exist inside the body. Anzaldua writes of her Chicana lesbian experience: "We're afraid of being abandoned by the mother, the culture, la Raza, for being unacceptable, faulty, damaged. Most of us unconsciously believe that if we reveal this unacceptable aspect of the self our mother/culture/race will totally reject us. To avoid rejection, some of us conform to the values of the culture, push the unacceptable parts into the shadows [...] We try to make ourselves conscious of the Shadow-Beast, stare at the sexual lust and lust for power and destruction we see on its face, discern among its features the under-shadow that the reigning order of heterosexual males project on our Beast. Yet still others of us take it another step: we try to waken the Shadow-Beast inside us." Anzaldua articulates herself always stuck at a border, attacked and rejected by both native culture and white culture for holding the truth of her lesbian identity: "Woman does not feel safe when her own culture, and white culture, are critical of her; when the males of all races hunt her as prey. Alienated from her mother culture, "alien" in the dominant culture, the woman of color does not feel safe within the inner life of her Self. Petrified, she can't respond, her face caught between, los intersticios, the spaces between the different worlds she inhabits." This account of queer experience illuminates how different forms of oppression manifest in the body. Anzaldua provides a narrative that explains "dual consciousness" of having to understand both dominant and non-dominant cultures to live in two worlds, both rejecting certain aspects of identity. Gloria Anzaldua draws on this narrative in an anthology titled This Bridge Called My Back: Writings by Radical Women of Color, which she coedited with Cherrie Moraga.  This Bridge Called My Back challenges the whiteness of mainstream queer discourse and uplifts and centers the political voices of marginalized women in an attempt to build international solidarity across difference: "We each are our sisters' and brothers' keepers; no one is an island or has ever been. Every person, animal, plant, stone is interconnected in a life and death symbiosis. We are each responsible for what is happening down the street, south of the border or across the sea." This provides a global perspective to queer theory and shows how individual liberation is bound to the international collective.

Kimberlé Crenshaw 
Kimberlé Crenshaw articulates the need to create a new framework that identifies difference and positions it as a source of strength because “ignoring difference within groups contributes to tension among groups”. Often organizations or social groups center the ways in which members are the same, identifying common interests, shared values and collective goals, instead of focusing on differences, which inevitably invisibilizes and silences the experiences of Black women and women of color. By looking at domestic violence, Crenshaw illustrates how women of color are subject to intersecting forces of oppression- racism and sexism- and how neither feminist nor antiracist theories nor practices adequately address or even acknowledge how those forces manifest in the lived experiences of women of color, especially those running from domestic abuse.

In a footnote, Crenshaw writes about how lesbian violence is often kept a secret, similar to violence within communities of color, because exposing violence makes an already marginalized group look worse in the eyes of the oppressor. Therefore, lesbians and women of color who experience violence in either queer or heterosexual relationships have to unfairly weigh the importance of holding their abuser accountable with the negative narrative that will be spread about their collective community, a narrative which they (as survivors) will also be hurt by. This reminds me of In the Dream House, a memoir about intimate violence within lesbian relationships. The author, Carmen Maria Machado, used memoir to shed light on the fact that violence exists in queer relationships just like it does in straight relationships. The fact that abuse is so often hidden, does not help victims. It is important to see harm in order to address it, without creating negative stereotypes about an entire group. This is important to the queer of color critique because if the experiences and needs of queer people of color are not recognized, addressed and centered in queer theory nor queer politics, it is impossible to create transformative radical change.

Limits of queer politics 
Building on this scholarship, author and activist Cathy Cohen illuminates the misgivings, contradictions and limitations of queer politics as they are currently constructed, while highlighting how queer theory and practice have radical potential for transformative change (1997). As is, queer politics "is understood as "in your face" politics of a younger generation...a willingness to confront normalizing power." Yet, as Barbara Smith points out, queer activists too often  "seem to operate in a historical and ideological vacuum". Here lies one of the contradictions in queer theory: it unapologetically fights against normative hegemonic structures, but fails to see the nuances of white normativity and class oppression within and outside the queer community. Queer identifying people participate and benefit from dominant institutions based on class status, while heterosexual people on welfare get policed for their sexual behavior or promiscuity. What defines queerness? Cohen argues the term "queer" is associated with assumptions of race (whiteness) and class privilege, preventing queers of color from wanting to participate fully in the community: "Because of my multiple identities, which located me and other queer people of color at the margins in this country, my material advancement, my physical protection and my emotional wellbeing are constantly threatened."  An expanded understanding of queer, beyond sexual orientation, as a resistance to all oppressive systems of power, would be to broaden the scope of queer politics. Brittney Cooper articulates that "one can't truly be a feminist if you don't really love women. And loving women deeply and unapologetically is queer as fuck." Cooper extends the label of queer to mean resistance to and rejection of dominant culture's norms. The queer of color critique might incorporate this understanding of queer and argue, alongside Cohen, that in order to become more radical and liberatory, queer politics must center "the marginal positions of punks, bull daggers, and welfare queens, for example, [as] the basis for progressive transformative coalition building."

Modern day 
Queer of color critique exists to challenge and push queer theory toward greater inclusivity and intersectionality. By centering the lived experiences of trans and gender non-conforming people of color, and operating in an anti-Black framework, transformative solutions and collective liberation become possible. In Unapologetic: A Black Queer and Feminist Mandate for Radical Movements, Charlene Carruthers- an organizer from Chicago- articulates a Black queer feminist lens as "a political praxis (practice and theory) based in Black feminist and LGBTQ traditions and knowledge, through which people and groups see to bring their full selves into the process of dismantling all systems of oppression. By using this lens, we are aided in creating alternatives of self-governance and self-determination, and by using it we can more effectively prioritize problems and methods that center historically marginalized people in our communities." In practice, organizations across the globe are doing work to dismantle systems of political oppression, create tangible change for people and seek joy in the process of the work. Among those practicing the queer of color critique include but are not limited to: The House of Tulip, Southern Fried Queer Pride, The Transgender Law Center and Spirit House. For example, the House of Tulip is a land justice organization that fights gentrification in New Orleans and provides affordable housing through community land trusts to trans and gender nonconforming people who are historically marginalized from accessing safe and stable housing. This work has long term political goals of disrupting racist and homophobic discrimination while providing tangible change to the experiences of trans and gender nonconforming young people, demonstrating how the queer of color critique can manifest in political practice.

As the queer of color critique grows and expands within the constant struggle for liberation, theorists continue to ask, what voices are being left out? How can international scholarship and queers from the global south be incorporated into the critique more equitably? Over the past few decades, it is clear that queer theory has in fact become queerer in its inclusion of diverse queer experiences, shaping a political framework that advocates for a world in which difference is strength and in which all people can thrive. While there are movements that still treat the white queer experience as universal, and there is still more work to do, many are coming to the realization that queerness exists as one of multiple intersecting identities, all of which need to be considered in order to dismantle white supremacy and capitalism.

References

Further reading 
 Refuse The Silence, Women of Color in Academia Speak Out
 Third World Women's Alliance. Black Women's Manifesto (1970. On-line)
 Patricia Hill Collins, Black Feminist Thought: Knowledge, Consciousness and the Politics of Empowerment (1990) and Black Sexual Politics: African Americans, Gender, and the New Racism (Routledge, 2005)
 bell hooks, Ain't I a Woman?: Black Women and Feminism (1981)
 Molara Ogundipe-Leslie, Re-Creating Ourselves: African Women & Critical Transformations (1994)
 Home Girls: A Black Feminist Anthology (Kitchen Table: Women of Color Press, 1983; Reed. 2000)
 This Bridge Called My Back: Writings by Radical Women of Color, edited by Cherríe Moraga and Gloria E. Anzaldúa (Persephone Press, 1981; 2nd edn 1984, Kitchen Table: Women of Color Press; translated into Spanish in 2002 by Cherríe Moraga, Ana Castillo, and Norma Alarcón)
 
 
 
 Ahmed, Sara. Queer Phenomenology, 2006
 Rodríguez, Juana María. Sexual Futures, Queer Gestures, and Other Latina Longings.
 Nash, Jennifer. Black Body in Ecstasy: Reading Race, Reading Pornography.
 Grady, Jonathan, Rigoberto Marquez, and Peter Mclaren. A Critique of Neoliberalism with Fierceness: Queer Youth of Color Creating Dialogues of Resistance.
 Manalansan, Martin F. Race, Violence, and Neoliberal Spatial Politics in the Global City.
 Shah, Svati P. Queering the Indian City: Urbanism in the Era of Transnational LGBT Rights. Antipode: A Radical Journal of Geography, August 2014, 1–17.
 
 Anzaldúa, Gloria. "To(o) Queer the Writer—Loca, escritor y chicana," originally published 1991; in AnaLouise Keating, The Gloria Anzaldúa Reader, 163–175
 Hames-García, Michael. "Queer Theory Revisited," in Gay Latino Studies: A Critical Reader, ed. Michael Hames-García and Ernesto J. Martínez (Durham, NC: Duke University Press, 2011), 19–45.
 Holland, Sharon. The Erotic Life of Racism (Durham, NC: Duke University Press, 2012).
 Manalansan IV, Martin. Global Divas: Filipino Gay Men in the Diaspora.
 Vaid, Urvashi. Irresistible Revolution: Confronting Race, Class and the Assumptions of LGBT Politics (Magnus Books, 2012).

Critical theory
Feminist theory
Queer feminism
Ethnic studies
Same-sex sexuality
Black feminism
Multiculturalism
Colonialism
Intersectional feminism
Race and society